Providence Historic District may refer to:
 Lake Providence Historic District, Lake Providence, Louisiana
 Providence Historic District (Providence, Ohio)
 Downtown Providence Historic District, Providence, Rhode Island
 Downtown Providence Historic District (Boundary Increase), Providence, Rhode Island
 Providence Historic District (Providence, Utah)